Keoghan is a surname. Notable people include:

Andrew Keoghan (born 1980), New Zealand musician and songwriter
Barry Keoghan (born 1992), Irish actor
Jack Keoghan (1887–1963), Irish hurler
Liam Keoghan (born 1967), Irish hurler
Martin Keoghan (born 1998), Irish hurler
Phil Keoghan (born 1967), New Zealand and American television presenter
Rebecca Keoghan, New Zealand dairy farmer and company director

See also
Kehoe (surname)
Keogh (surname)
Keohane (disambiguation)
Keough (surname)
McKeogh
McKeough (disambiguation)